Syria (SYR) competed at the 2002 Asian Games in Busan, South Korea. The total medal tally was 3.

Medals

Bronze
 Boxing
Men's Heavyweight 91 kg: Naser Al-Shami
Men's Featherweight 57 kg: Yasser Sheikhan

 Wrestling
Men's Greco-Roman 84 kg: Mohammad Ken

See also
 Syria at the 2006 Asian Games

Nations at the 2002 Asian Games
2002
Asian Games